Pablo Eduardo Repetto Aquino (born 14 March 1974) is a Uruguayan football manager and former player who played as a midfielder.

Playing career
Born in Montevideo, Repetto began his career at Montevideo Wanderers' youth setup in 1988. After playing for the youth sides of Racing Club de Montevideo, he made his senior debut with Fénix in 1995, aged 20.

In 1998, Repetto fractured his tibia and fibula, which kept him sidelined for one and a half year. In 2000, after six unsuccessful months at Villa Teresa, he retired.

Managerial career

After retiring, Repetto acquired a coaching license and returned to his first club Fénix as manager of the youth setup in 2002. In July 2006, he took over the first team in Segunda División, and achieved promotion at the end of the season.

Ahead of the 2008–09 season, Repetto was named in charge of Cerro also in Primera División. The following 20 February, he was appointed at Bolivian side Blooming, but left the club in June.

On 16 December 2009, Repetto returned to Cerro, and led the side in the 2010 Copa Libertadores. He left the following May, and was appointed at the helm of fellow league team Defensor Sporting shortly after.

Repetto won the 2010 Torneo Apertura with Defensor, but lost the Final to Nacional. On 9 December 2011, he was dismissed.

On 24 September 2012, after nearly a year without a club, Repetto took over Ecuadorian Serie A side Independiente del Valle. He led the side to the 2016 Copa Libertadores Finals before being presented as manager of Emirati side Baniyas on 31 July of that year.

Repetto was relieved of his duties on 21 October 2016, and returned to South America on 15 December to take over Olimpia in Paraguay. He was sacked the following 24 February, after only six matches, and was presented as manager of LDU Quito on 5 July 2017.

Repetto led LDU to titles of Ecuadorian Serie A, Copa Ecuador and Supercopa Ecuador during his period at the club, but left on a mutual consent on 16 June 2021. On 11 December, he took over Nacional back in his home country.

Repetto led Nacional to their 2022 Primera División title, but still left the club on 9 November of that year.

Managerial statistics

Honours

Manager
Fénix
Uruguayan Segunda División: 2006–07

Defensor Sporting
Apertura: 2010

LDU Quito
Ecuadorian Serie A: 2018
Copa Ecuador: 2019
Supercopa Ecuador: 2020

Nacional
Intermedio: 2022
Clausura: 2022
Uruguayan Primera División: 2022

References

External links

1969 births
Living people
Footballers from Montevideo
Uruguayan footballers
Association football midfielders
Centro Atlético Fénix players
Villa Española players
Uruguayan football managers
Centro Atlético Fénix managers
C.A. Cerro managers
Defensor Sporting managers
Club Nacional de Football managers
Club Blooming managers
C.S.D. Independiente del Valle managers
Club Olimpia managers
L.D.U. Quito managers
UAE Pro League managers
Uruguayan expatriate football managers
Uruguayan expatriate sportspeople in Bolivia
Uruguayan expatriate sportspeople in Ecuador
Uruguayan expatriate sportspeople in the United Arab Emirates
Uruguayan expatriate sportspeople in Paraguay
Expatriate football managers in Bolivia
Expatriate football managers in Ecuador
Expatriate football managers in the United Arab Emirates
Expatriate football managers in Paraguay